Nicole Tourneur (9 August 1950 – 14 May 2011) was a French novelist.

Biography
Born in Maisons-Alfort, Tourneur trained as an accountant. She lived in Mexico.

Works

For adults 
 Le dernier soleil
 Laurie ou le souffle du papillon, novel (Gunten, Dole), 2001
 Les fenêtres, novella  (Gunten, Dole), 2002
 Passé compliqué, novel  (Gunten, Dole), 2004
 Les Dieux sont servis, novel (Gunten, Dole), 2006
 Terre brûlante, novel (Gunten, Dole), 2009
 Où va le temps ... novella (Janus, Paris), 2010
 Le serpentin des mots novel (Editions du bout de la rue), 2011

For children 
 Clara et les nuages (Éditions du Bout de la Rue), 2007
 Girouette la chouette (Éditions du Bout de la Rue), 2007
 Les péripéties d’Antoine - le vaccin (Éditions du Bout de la Rue), 2007
 Le lama vert qui n'avait pas d'oreilles (Éditions du Bout de la Rue), 2009
 Oscar le suricate qui portait malheur (Éditions du Bout de la Rue), 2011

References

External links 
 Website of the author 

1950 births
2011 deaths
Deaths from cancer in France
French women novelists
20th-century French novelists
20th-century French women writers
People from Maisons-Alfort
French expatriates in Mexico